Delhi is an unincorporated community in Caldwell County, in the U.S. state of Texas. According to the Handbook of Texas, the community had a population of 300 in 2000. It is located within the Greater Austin metropolitan area.

History
The community is rich in fine sandy loam soils that make agriculture and livestock feasible to raise. A post office was established in Delhi in 1873 and remained in operation until 1929. A Primitive Baptist church was established in 1880 and a permanent cemetery was established a year later. Delhi had two gristmills and two cotton gins as well as 150 inhabitants. It reached 200 settlers by 1890 but it then decreased to 30 settlers when a general store opened in Delhi in 1925. The 1936 county highway map showed several scattered houses, a church, a cemetery, and only one business in the settlement. The population declined to 25 in 1940. A community center has been in operation since 1951, in the building that was formerly the one-room schoolhouse. It is said to be named for a medicine man who traveled to the community and stayed there for several months in the late 19th century. A church, a cemetery, a volunteer fire department, and the community center marked the community even though it is not labeled on county maps. Its population was estimated at 300 in 2000.

Today the cemetery in the community is on the left side of the road, enclosed by a tidy, but not unique, cyclone fence, and is identified by an overhead arch that reads “Dehli-1881”. There are more Confederate and American flags in the cemetery than there are tombstones. There is a granite marker that stands just outside the fence, with the explanation as to why it doesn't appear on state maps in the number of names inscribed in the cemetery. Delhi was home to 32 soldiers who served in the American Civil War, Vietnam War, both World Wars, “police actions”, and other conflicts. They never served in the Spanish-American War, even though trains carrying them from Florida passed through Luling. They had various surnames, such as Fogle, Cox, Reid, Neeley, and Pendleton. The first settlers in the community were Orrin L., and Susannah Winters and their extended family. The first store in Delhi opened in the early 1870s in Daniel Winters’ home. The first name given to the community, Iron Mountain, was rejected by postal workers. A man named John Reid was the first postmaster. The community's namesake also provided entertainment for its citizens. It had a second church in the 1880s, along with a blacksmith and casket shop and a syrup mill. Most of its present-day residents are descendants of the community's first settlers.

A wildfire hit Delhi during the state's 2011 wildfire season. People living in Delhi also say that jaguarundis are a common site in the area, in which they came to the area from a ranch in South Texas.

Geography

Education
Delhi had two schools, one in 1884 and another in 1936. They joined with the McMahan school district in 1947. Today the community is served by the Lockhart Independent School District.

References

Unincorporated communities in Caldwell County, Texas
Unincorporated communities in Texas